Ian Gillan Yuill, (born 12 February 1964) is a Scottish politician who has served as councillor in Aberdeen, Scotland since 1994. A member of the Scottish Liberal Democrats, he has served alongside Alex Nicoll of the Scottish National Party as Co-Leader of Aberdeen City Council since 18 May 2022. He was previously the Depute Leader of Aberdeen City Council from 2003 to 2007 and Chair of NESTRANS from 2011 to 2012. Yuill was both Convener of the Scottish Liberal Democrats and Vice President of the UK Liberal Democrats between 1998 and 2002.

Background and personal life
Born in Perth, Scotland, Yuill was brought up and educated in Aberdeen. He was educated at Robert Gordon's College in Aberdeen and at Robert Gordon Institute of Technology (now Robert Gordon University), Aberdeen, where he obtained a BA in Business Studies. He worked in Aberdeen as a retail manager, political campaign organiser, constituency manager for Nicol Stephen MP, community business manager and senior manager for a large Scottish charity. Yuill is a Chartered Marketer.

Political career
Yuill was elected to represent the Auchinyell division of the former Grampian Regional Council on 5 May 1994 and subsequently to represent the Morningside ward of the then newly created Aberdeen City Council on 6 April 1995.

He has continued to represent the same general area of Aberdeen through a number of ward name and ward boundary changes and currently represents the Airyhall/Broomhill/Garthdee ward. He was most recently re-elected in May 2022.

On 18 May 2022 Yuill was appointed Co-Leader of Aberdeen City Council as part of a Partnership Agreement between the Liberal Democrats and SNP to form a coalition to control the Council. 

Yuill stood for election to the Scottish Parliament in 1999 (North East Scotland Region) and again in 2021 (Aberdeen South and North Kincardine constituency and North East Scotland Region).

He also stood for the Aberdeen South UK Parliament constituency in the 2001 election, but was defeated by the Scottish Labour candidate Anne Begg. He again stood for Aberdeen South in the 2019 UK general election. The constituency was won by SNP candidate Stephen Flynn.

References

External links 
Councillor Ian Yuill page on Aberdeen City Council website
Ian Yuill website

Scottish Liberal Democrat politicians
1964 births
Living people
People educated at Robert Gordon's College
Liberal Democrats (UK) parliamentary candidates
Scottish political candidates